Lester Collins may refer to:

Lester Collins (landscape architect) (1914–1993), American landscape architect 
Shad Collins (1910–1978), American jazz trumpet player